Guia may refer to:

 Guia (Albufeira), a parish in the municipality of Albufeira, Portugal
 Guia (Pombal), a parish in the municipality of Pombal, Portugal
 Guia Hill, one of the seven hills of Macau
Guia Fortress, a historical military fort, chapel, and lighthouse complex in the former Portuguese colony of Macau
 Guia Circuit, a temporary race track in the streets of Macau, named after Guia Hill
 Guia Race of Macau, an annual international touring car race held on the circuit

See also 
 Teve Guía, a Puerto Rican gossip and listings magazine
 Guía de Isora, a municipality in the province of Santa Cruz de Tenerife, Canary Islands
 Guia lighthouse (Cascais) a lighthouse on the outskirts of the Portuguese town of Cascais
 Santa María de Guía de Gran Canaria, commonly known as Guía, a municipality on Grand Canary island, Canary Islands
 Flor de Guía cheese, a cheese made in the Canary Islands
 Nuestra Señora de Guía, a Catholic image in the Philippines.